New Offenburg is an unincorporated community in Sainte Genevieve County, Missouri, Missouri, United States. It is located approximately ten miles southwest of Ste. Genevieve on Route 32.

The community was named after Offenburg, a German city between the Black Forest and the river Rhine, the place where its early settlers originated from.

History
In 1867 the settlers in New Offenburg founded a first Post Office ( Post Office ). The small settlement developed around this post office. New Offenburg was on the Missouri – Illinois Railroad, a major railroad that operated between 1921 and 1978. Today New Offenburg is on Missouri State Route 32.

German-speaking descendants of the immigrants at that time live in New Offenburg to this day and speak a dialect of Baden in addition to American English. Other speakers of the Baden dialects can be found in Weingarten and Zell.

Geography

It is located 10 miles southwest of Ste. Genevieve. Coordinates are 37.9086642°N, -90.1973404°W.

Climate

The climate in this area is characterized by hot, humid summers and generally cool winters. According to the Köppen Climate Classification system, New Offenburg has a humid subtropical climate, abbreviated "Cfa" on climate maps.

Education

New Offenburg is served by the St. Genevieve School District with Ste. Genevieve Sr. High School, Middle and elementary School.

In Media
In 2013, the German documentary filmmaker Johannes Suhm shot the Documentation "New Offenburg - The Last Badeners in the USA" about the residents of the settlement.

Gallery

References

Unincorporated communities in Ste. Genevieve County, Missouri
Unincorporated communities in Missouri